Judith Kuipers (born 9 November 1972) is a Dutch football manager who serves as head coach of the Cook Islands women's national football team.

Career
Kuipers started her managerial career with VV Alkmaar in 2018. In 2019, she was appointed head coach of the Cook Islands women's national football team.

References

External links
 Mijn tijd als bondscoach op de Cook Eilanden
 INTERVIEW: Cook Islands Head Coach Judith Kuipers on taking the new job 
 Improving Cook Islands navigate their way through Pacific 
 Judith Kuipers met vrouwen Cook Eilanden naar Pacific Games! 
 'We moeten dit jaar groeien als team' - Judith Kuipers kijkt uit naar nieuw seizoen VV Alkmaar 
 VV Alkmaar vindt in Judith Kuipers haar droomtrainer  

1972 births
Living people
Dutch women's footballers
Dutch football managers
Women's association football defenders
FC Utrecht (women) players
Eredivisie (women) players
Dutch expatriate football managers
Expatriate football managers in the Cook Islands